Peter Muzzell (born 29 September 1939) is a South African former cricketer. He played in 42 first-class matches for Border from 1957/58 to 1969/70.

See also
 List of Border representative cricketers

References

External links
 

1939 births
Living people
South African cricketers
Border cricketers
People from Stutterheim
Cricketers from the Eastern Cape